"Tints" is a song performed by American rapper and singer Anderson .Paak; issued as the lead single from his third studio album Oxnard. The song is a duet rap with fellow American hip hop recording artist Kendrick Lamar; and it peaked at #9 on the Billboard Adult R&B chart in 2018.

"Tints" was certified gold by the Recording Industry Association of America on May 21, 2021. On December 1, 2018, Anderson .Paak and Kendrick Lamar performed the song on Saturday Night Live.

Music video
 
The official music video for "Tints" was directed by Colin Tilley.

Chart positions

Certifications

References

External links
  
 

2018 songs
2018 singles
Aftermath Entertainment singles
Anderson .Paak songs
Kendrick Lamar songs  
Music videos directed by Colin Tilley
Song recordings produced by Om'Mas Keith
Song recordings produced by Anderson .Paak
Songs written by Jeff Gitelman
Songs written by Om'Mas Keith
Songs written by Kendrick Lamar
Songs written by Rob Lewis (producer)
Songs written by Anderson .Paak
Songs written by Tayla Parx